Oosterhout (from ooster, "eastern", and hout, "woods") is a municipality and a city in the southern Netherlands.

Population centers 
The municipality of Oosterhout includes the following places:

History
Oosterhout is mentioned for the first time in 1277, although archaeological excavations showed the existence of human settlements in the area in prehistoric times. The Knights Templar had a temple here dedicated to St. John the Baptist. It was home to a castle which later acquired control over the surrounding area, up to Breda and Bergen op Zoom. The castle was destroyed by Spanish troops during the Eighty Years War, in 1573; only a tower of it survives today. 

The city became the seat of a flourishing ceramics industry, which lasted until the 19th century. In 1625 the city was besieged by Frederick Henry, Prince of Orange, and suffered heavy damage. 

Despite the rise of Protestantism, it was home to several Catholic monasteries, including that of the Premonstratensians, which is still active. Oosterhout received city rights in 1809, by will of Louis Bonaparte.

Main sights
Slotjes (Castle)
Unfinished basilica of St. John. A Romanesque church existed in 1277, but from around 1473 it was rebuilt in the current Gothic style, being finished in 1493. The tower was constructed from 1519 to 1552. It was restored several times in the following centuries.
Monastery of St. Catherine, once a castle held by the Knights Hospitaller.
Slotbossetoren, destroyed castle

Culture 

De anoniemen a group of statues created by Paul Elshout is situated in Slotpark.

Sport 

Oosterhout is home to several sports clubs, for example volleyball club VOKO, football clubs SCO-Tofs, VV Oosterhout, baseball club Twins and hockey club De Warande.

Sport clubs

Notable people

 Willem Hendrik de Vriese (1806–1862) a Dutch botanist and physician
 Christiaan Snouck Hurgronje (1857–1936) a Dutch scholar of Oriental cultures and Advisor to the colonial government of the Netherlands East Indies
 Marinus De Jong (1891-1984) a Belgian composer and pianist of Dutch origin
 Gerrit Brokx (1933–2002) a Dutch politician
 Johannes Wilhelmus Maria Liesen (born 1960) a Dutch clergyman and bishop of the Roman Catholic Diocese of Breda
 Mirjam Mous (born 1963) a Dutch author of children's literature
 Marlies Dekkers (born 1965) a Dutch fashion designer
 Peter Kops (born 1967) known as Extince, a Dutch rapper
 Sander P. Zwegers (born 1975) a Dutch mathematician and academic

Sport 

 Kees Pijl (1897–1976) a Dutch footballer with 203 caps for Feyenoord, competed in the 1924 Summer Olympics
 Wanny van Gils (1959–2018) a Dutch football player with over 300 club caps and coach
 Kelly van Zon (born 1987) a Dutch table tennis player
 Wesley Vissers (born 1993) a Dutch professional bodybuilder
 Jennifer Vreugdenhil (born 1995) a Dutch footballer

Gallery

References

External links 

 

 
Municipalities of North Brabant
Populated places in North Brabant
Cities in the Netherlands